Pterolophia robinsoni is a species of beetle in the family Cerambycidae. It was described by Charles Joseph Gahan in 1906.

References

robinsoni
Beetles described in 1906